Leo M. van Wijk (born 18 October 1946 in Amsterdam) is a Dutch executive, and former president and CEO of KLM and vice-chairman of Air France-KLM S.A.

Van Wijk studied at University of Amsterdam, receiving a Master's degree in Econometrics in 1971. He joined KLM Royal Dutch Airlines on that year, starting with various positions in Automation Services. In 1977 he moved to Cargo Division, being appointed Manager Cargo Handling in March 1979. Successive career moves were Manager Cargo Marketing in 1983, and Vice President KLM Marketing in 1984, Deputy to the Senior Vice President Commercial Services in 1987, and Senior Vice President Corporate Development in 1989.

Van Wijk was also a skilled athlete. He played soccer for AFC Ajax and was in the same teams as Johan Cruyff albeit he never reached the first team. As a baseball player he reached the first team of Ajax who then appeared in the Dutch major league. He made his debut in 1964 in the major league with Ajax against the Haarlem Nicols in the seventh inning and hit a home run. His position was shortstop.

Van Wijk joined KLM’s Board of Managing Directors on January 1, 1991. With the reorganization of the company's top management, effective January 1, 1997, he took on the responsibilities of Chief Operating Officer (COO) as a member of the Board.
Leo van Wijk became KLM’s President and Chief Executive Officer (CEO) on August 6, 1997. His term ended in 2007.

Mr van Wijk is also a member of:
- The Board of Directors of Northwest Airlines
- The Supervisory Board of Martinair
- The Advisory Council of ABN AMRO
- The Supervisory Board of Aegon
- The Supervisory Board of Randstad Holding

References

 

1946 births
Living people
Air France–KLM
Dutch chief executives in the airline industry
Dutch corporate directors
Businesspeople from Amsterdam
Dutch baseball players
AFC Ajax non-playing staff